Sherman White may refer to:

Sherman White (American football) (born 1948),  National Football League player for the Cincinnati Bengals 
Sherman White (basketball) (1928–2011), Long Island University basketball player who was indicted in a point shaving scandal
Sherman White (ice hockey) (1923–1975), National Hockey League player for the New York Rangers